Sara Carmo (born 12 October 1986, Cascais) is a Portuguese sports sailor. At the 2012 Summer Olympics, she competed in the Women's Laser Radial class, finishing in 28th place.

References

Portuguese female sailors (sport)
Living people
Olympic sailors of Portugal
Sailors at the 2012 Summer Olympics – Laser Radial
1986 births
Sportspeople from Cascais
Sailors at the 2016 Summer Olympics – Laser Radial